St. Xavier's College is a private, Catholic, autonomous higher education college under Calcutta University run by the Calcutta Province of the Society of Jesus in Kolkata, India. It was founded by the Jesuits in 1860 and named after St. Francis Xavier, a Jesuit saint of the 16th century, who travelled to India. In 2006, it became the first autonomous college in West Bengal, India, and is affiliated to the University of Calcutta.

The National Institutional Ranking Framework has ranked the college 4th in India in 2021 and 8th in 2022.

History 

The crest has remained the same, since it was undertaken in 1905.
The college was founded in 1860 by the Jesuits, an all-male Catholic religious order formed by Saint Ignatius of Loyola. The college is named after Francis Xavier, the 16th century Spanish Jesuit saint. The founder of the college is Fr. Henri Depelchin. SJ. He had overseen most of the ground work, during the foundation years.

Sans Souci theatre
30 Park Street (now Mother Teresa Sarani), Kolkata-700016, was where the Sans Souci theatre was located, before 1843. A fire broke out in 1843, leaving nothing but ashes. This same address was later bought by 7 Jesuits, who had arrived from Belgium. It is here, that the present day campus stands tall.

Foundation years
The present 30, Park Street address where the college is situated, is an amalgamation of numbers 10 and 11 of Park Street. Premise number 11, was bought for Rs 45,000.00, by Fr. Depelchen. These funds were made possible with the generous donations of the Anglo-Indians and with help from the home Province of Belgium. Park street is located in the heart of Kolkata and is a landmark street in the city, a melting pot of its diverse cultural, culinary, social and intellectual milieu.

The very first class had as few as 40 students. Later, in 1862, two years after its inception, the college was affiliated to the Calcutta University.

However, there was a paucity of funds for expansion work in terms of class rooms and to accommodate the Jesuits fathers. So The Rector appealed to the public of Calcutta in newspapers for generous assistance and was responded to with magnanimity by well wishers of the city in 1864. Besides Fr Depelchin and his assistant,  Br. Koppes the builder went around personally collecting funds. The present imposing 5 storied building was built in an interval of 6 years, from 1934 to 1940 at a cost of Rs 9 lakhs, which was collected partly from the public of Calcutta, assistance from Belgium, and the huge rental received from the American army that occupied the building during the second war. Expansion of the college has been a ceaseless effort, with a campus slated to come up in Salt Lake City, Kolkata and a second boys' hostel not far away from the existing one.

Goethals Library
The Goethals library, which is located above the College Chapel, houses some of the oldest periodicals, journals and books. The treasures were inherited by the Jesuit Fathers in 1908, from the then Archbishop of Calcutta, Paul Goethals, S.J. Today, the treasures are well preserved and the library has become a spot of historical significance.

Postal stamp

A commemorative stamp was issued by the Indian Post on 12 April 1985 depicting the college campus. Thus recognizing the college's contribution to society.

Courses 

The college has morning batch for boys only, that offers the Bachelor of Commerce degree. The day section of the college houses the arts and science departments which offer undergraduate (honours) degrees in various subjects like English, Bengali, political science, sociology, microbiology, computer science, animation and multimedia, mass communication and videography, mathematics, chemistry, physics, and economics. Masters programs in commerce (evening session), biotechnology (integrated five-year MSc), physics, microbiology and education are housed in the college along with the co-educational Bachelor of Commerce (evening) and Bachelor of Business Administration programs. The college has also introduced post-graduate programmes in english, political science and sociology since 2019.

The college, in its first ever foreign collaboration, has entered into a tie-up with the University of Manitoba, Canada. The MOU was unveiled on 4 Feb 2008 by the principal of the college, Father PC Mathew and the dean of the faculty of food and agricultural sciences at Manitoba University, Professor Michael Trevan.

Infrastructure 

The college classes are spread over four floors across two buildings. There are over 50 classrooms, half a dozen audio-visual rooms and three computer laboratories, each with a capacity to seat over 70 people.

The college also has well-equipped physics, chemistry and biotechnology laboratories to support the requirements of their respective departments; the Mass Communication and Videography department has a video library to assist its film students. The Central Library, spread over two floors, houses reference books from a gamut of different subjects, in addition to numerous periodicals, again from diverse fields; scientific journals and archives are also available as are books on fiction. The auditorium, equipped with state-of-the-art sound and lighting systems, has a seating capacity of over 800 people. The football, and basketball courts are located behind the main college building and are shared between the college students and the students of St. Xavier's Collegiate School, the secondary section of which is housed in an adjacent flank of the college building.

Hangouts
The canteen, the "Green Benches" - a popular, wi-fi enabled, student hangout area and Fr. Joris's Corner- an in-house stationery shop, are located parallel to the sports grounds. These are very heavily buzzing places during off periods and breaks.

The "Green Benches" has become the best place in the campus for hanging out and having fun. The spot has a citywide reputation, for socializing and indulging in 'intelligent talks' with classmates.

Popular culture 

The college has a culture of festivals- inter- and intra-college that span its academic calendar; that apart, the college campus and auditorium are often chosen as venues by outsider parties, in collaboration with the college, to host discussions and events. The college has also played host to numerous celebrity guests:

 Amitabh Bachchan and Prakash Jha visited the campus to promote their film Aarakshan in the year 2011; 
 Former President A. P. J. Abdul Kalam has been a part of the college's annual Earth Summit more than once; 
 Pranab Mukherjee, former President India, has also visited the college;
 Prime Minister Manmohan Singh, visited the campus on occasion of the 150th year celebrations;
 Ranbir Kapoor, Anurag Basu and Priyanka Chopra, visited the college to promote their film Barfi!, in 2012;
 KK, Mohit Chauhan, Sonu Nigam, Mika Singh, Monali Thakur, among others have performed at Beyond Barriers, an alumni organized, musical show, held at the college grounds, every year.

Convocation – keynote speakers

 M. K. Narayanan, Governor of West Bengal
 Former Home Minister and Finance Minister P. Chidambaram
 West Bengal Chief Minister Mamata Banerjee

Community and clubs 

Apart from doing service to the community in the educational sphere, St. Xavier's is also involved in the environmental issues, youth welfare, women's welfare and poverty reduction.

The college has an elected non-political student body called St. Xavier's College Student Council (SXCSC) which co-ordinates all the cultural activities on the campus.

The college also has many active clubs, which are aimed at building leadership, creativity and managerial qualities in students. A list of clubs and societies are mentioned below:

 Entrepreneurship Development Cell (EDC)
 Fine Arts Society
 National Cadet Corps (NCC)
 National Service Scheme (NSS)
 The Sports Department
 Hindi Literary Society (HLS)
 Bengali Literary Society (BLS)
 Xavierian Theatrical Society (XTS)
 Xavier's Academy of Dance & Music (XADAM)
 Xaverian Center for Equality and Liberty (XCEL)
 Xavier's Finance Community (XFC)
 Xavier's Commerce Society (XCS)
 Xavier's Management Society (XMS)
 Leadership Training Service (LTS)
 The English Academy
 The Debating Society (XDS)
 The Placement Cell

Sports and festivals 

The college has facilities for playing sports like: Football, Basketball, Hockey, Volleyball, Cricket, Table Tennis, Badminton, Carrom and Foosball. These games are played throughout the year at both intra-college and inter-college levels.

A sports day is organised, every year in December. Students of the college, compete in various track and field events, on this day, amidst huge audiences from all over the city.

St. Xavier's College has some of the best festivals at the Undergraduate level in the country.

 XAVOTSAV, the cultural festival is held annually in late January or early February. Most colleges of Kolkata are invited to participate in events like Band Performance, Neon Dance, Classical Dance, Singing etc. This festival is organized by the Students Union along with the alumni body of the college.
 PRISM is the annual corporate simulation organised by EDC for first years. 
 INERTIA, the international marketing festival is held annually in February or March. The events comprises Ambush Marketing, Ad Spoof, Brand Manager, International Trade and Crisis Management to name a few. The participants of this festival are Undergraduate as well as post-graduate students from around India and its neighboring countries. This festival is organized by the students and professors of the Department of Management (Commerce).
 INSIGNIA, the management festival is held annually in mid February. The top ten commerce colleges of India are invited to fight it out in events like Human Resource Management (HRM), Best Manager, Business Quiz, Marketing and Entrepreneurship Development (ED) among many other events. This festival is organized by the students of the Bachelors of Commerce department (B.Com.).
 XAVIER'S MANAGEMENT CONVENTION (XMC), the management festival is held annually in February or March. XMC is a national festival. It includes events like Stress Interview (SI), B-Quiz (BQ), Business Plans(BP) and Advertising. This festival is organized by the students of the Bachelors of Business Administration (BBA) department.
 ENTREPRENEURSHIP AWARENESS CAMP (EAC), organised by the EDC is an entrepreneurial bootcamp session that spans over two to three days and features speaker sessions by eminent personalities of the startup world, and mentoring and investing sessions for startups that participate in the event from across the country. 
 SPECTRUM is the festival of the Department of Physics. It comprises debate, quiz, drama, lectures by famous noble laureates and many more. It generally spans for a period of two days.

St. Xavier's is the only English medium college to have separate festivals for Hindi and Bengali.

 VIVIDHA, the Hindi festival, comprises events like Drama Competition, Extempore, Elocution etc. The mode of communication throughout the festival is Hindi.This festival is organized by the members of the Hindi Literary Society (HLS).
 XAVULLASH, the Bengali festival, comprises events like Debate, Extempore, Elocution etc. The mode of communication throughout the festival is Bengali.This festival is organized by the members of the Bengali Literary Society (BLS).
 The Department of Political Science inaugurated 3 major programmes since 2016 - SUFFRAGIUM started as the department's annual event. The day starts with the launching of the departmental journal Politique and offers a Q&A session between the students and the panelists comprising esteemed political scientists and researchers. The day also includes fun activities like Poli-Rattle  (Just-A-Minute), Polo-Verse and Expeditious (Political Quiz).SANSAD is a Mock Parliament wherein students engage in a support/oppose debate on any political agenda acting as a simulation of the Lok Sabha.

Publications 

A list of magazines that college students publish every year. These magazines are widely appreciated in academic circles:

 XAVERIAN: includes articles by students and staff members, who share their experiences of college. It also includes interviews with famous alumni members and photos of passing out batches.
 YOUTHINK, the annual commerce journal which includes articles from students and staff members on current commerce related issues. The topics in the past volumes were The Business of Sports, Turbulent Times, Superpowers, Change and The Gamble.
 ODE TO EXPRESSIONS is the annual magazine published by the English Academy. The magazine has featured columns by personalities such as Shashi Tharoor and Devdutt Pattanaik, among others. 
 ECO ECHOES is the annual economics journal published by the Economics Department.
 HORIZON is the annual physics journal published by the Department of Physics.It highlights the technological advancements of the world.
 PEBBLE  is the annual journal published by the St Xavier's College Science Association (SXCSA).
 POLITIQUE is the annual political journal published by the Department of Political Science that includes students' articles based on current affairs and global issues.

Philanthropy and social activities 
Prayas, a 3-day boot camp aimed at making underprivileged kids aware of the need of higher education was started in 2006 by the then principal of the college, Rev. Felix Raj, S.J. In the boot-camp, underprivileged children are brought to the college campus from nearby villages and slums for a fun filled day of activity and entertainment. The children are provided with free meals and gifts. This festival is organized by the social work department (under the National Service Scheme) of the university.

Alumni association 

The college has a very active alumni association known as SXCAA, whose principal is the college president. The association supports the college in several projects by extending financial and managerial assistance. SXCAA is registered under the West Bengal Societies Registration Act. It was the first alumni association in Kolkata to be granted 80G Certification from the Income Tax Department, acknowledging SXCAA's philanthropic activities.

SXCAA has been expanding its reach to ex-students by opening chapters in several cities around the world, including Bangalore, Mumbai, Delhi, Singapore, London, Dubai, New York and Dhaka.

Project 'Lakshaya' was launched by the college to invite donations from alumni to fund a new campus.  The West Bengal government allotted the college  of land at Rajarhat (New Town) for the new campus. The land will cost a subsidized 64 crores.

Rankings 

As of 2022, the college is ranked eighth in India by the National Institutional Ranking Framework.

Notable alumni 

 Aditya Vikram Birla – Former Chairman of Aditya Birla Group
 Amar Singh – Indian Politician
 Chandrajit Banerjee – Director General of Confederation of Indian Industry
 Chinmoy Guha – Former Head of the English Department, University of Calcutta, Sahitya Akademi Award winner (2019)
 Hamoodur Rahman – 7th Chief Justice of Pakistan
 Jeremy Bujakowski - Polish–Indian alpine skier
 Kamal Nath – Former Chief Minister of Madhya Pradesh and Union Minister Govt of India, 9 time Member of parliament, Lok Sabha
 Kazi Nuruzzaman  – Soldier in Bangladesh Liberation War, awarded Bir Uttom
 Lagnajita Chakraborty – playback singer 
 Pramatha Chaudhuri – Writer during the Bengal Renaissance 
 R. Gopalakrishnan – Executive Director of Tata Sons
 Ramananda Chatterjee – Journalist
 Shashi Tharoor – Politician, Member of Parliament, Diplomat at the UN, Author.
 Siddhartha Shankar Ray – Former Chief Minister of West Bengal
 Sombhu Mitra – Indian film actor, received the Padma Bhushan and Ramon Magsaysay Award
 Sourav Ganguly – Former Captain of Indian Cricket Team
 Syed Manzur Elahi – Former adviser to the Caretaker Government of Bangladesh
 Tarasankar Bandyopadhyay – Novelist, awarded Padma Bhushan 
 Utpal Dutt – Actor, awarded Sangeet Natak Akademi Fellowship and National Film Award for Best Actor, 1970

See also 
 St. Xavier's Collegiate School
 List of Jesuit sites
 List of schools named after Francis Xavier

References

External links 

 
 

St. Xavier's College, Kolkata
Schools in Colonial India
Jesuit universities and colleges in India
Educational institutions established in 1860
University of Calcutta affiliates
Commerce colleges in India
1860 establishments in India